Mid Tipperary was a UK Parliament constituency in Ireland, returning one Member of Parliament 1885–1922. Prior to the 1885 general election the area was part of the Tipperary. From 1922, on the establishment of the Irish Free State, it was not represented in the UK Parliament.

Boundaries
This constituency comprised the central part of County Tipperary.

1885–1922: The baronies of Eliogarty, Ikerrin and Kilnamanagh Lower, that part of the barony of Kilnamanagh Upper not contained within the constituency of North Tipperary, and that part of the barony of Slievardagh contained in the parishes of Ballingarry, Buolick, Fennor, Kilcooly and Lickfinn.

Members of Parliament

Elections

Elections in the 1880s

Elections in the 1890s

Mayne resigns, prompting a by-election.

McCarthy dies, causing a by-election.

Elections in the 1900s

Elections in the 1910s

References

The Parliaments of England by Henry Stooks Smith (1st edition published in three volumes 1844–50), 2nd edition edited (in one volume) by F.W.S. Craig (Political Reference Publications 1973)

Westminster constituencies in County Tipperary (historic)
Dáil constituencies in the Republic of Ireland (historic)
Constituencies of the Parliament of the United Kingdom established in 1885
Constituencies of the Parliament of the United Kingdom disestablished in 1922